Cimbex americanus, the elm sawfly, is a species of sawfly in the family Cimbicidae. This is a very large species of Hymenoptera, with adults measuring 3 cm and larvae reaching 5 cm long. If captured, adults may buzz and use their powerful spiny legs defensively. However, like other sawflies, this species does not possess a sting. The fly Opheltes glaucopterus is a parasite of the prepupae stage of this sawfly.

Taxonomy 
This species was originally described as Cimbex americana by William Elford Leach, who treated the genus as feminine. However, Cimbex comes from a masculine Greek noun, and the International Commission on Zoological Nomenclature thus requires masculine species. Thus, its correct name is Cimbex americanus.

References

External links

 

Cimbicidae
Articles created by Qbugbot